Kevin Scott Rhoads (born August 7, 1976) is an American musician, singer-songwriter, composer, music-producer, and performer.

Early life
Rhoads was born in Tucson, Arizona, the younger of two sons.  He moved to Denver, Colorado soon after he was born, and many places thereafter, eventually settling in Fort Myers, Florida. At age 15, he began focusing intensely on music, learning many instruments including bass, piano, and harmonica. He bought his first 4 track recorder in 9th grade, and began recording his own songs.  He graduated high school in 1994 and moved to Fort Worth, Texas where he attended Texas Christian University.  He graduated with a Bachelor of Arts in Religion. He moved to Nashville in 2001, but it was not until 2007 that he started work on his debut album Dead Language with producers Robin Eaton and Lij Shaw.

Career
Dead Language was released in 2007 and received excellent critical reviews. American Songwriter called it "an exhibition in style, grace and limitless possibilities..." Listen! Nashville says: "Rhoads has the perfectionism and musicianship of Roger Waters, as well as a similar political chip on his shoulder, making him a force to be reckoned with."  He toured as the opening act for Marc Broussard, Ari Hest, Butterfly Boucher, and Erin McCarley. In January 2010, he performed at the prestigious ASCAP music cafe at Sundance Film Festival, as well as SXSW in Austin, Texas. His second album The Wilderness was released on March 5, 2013. His songs have been featured on the shows CSI: Miami, and World of Jenks on MTV.

K.S. Rhoads often plays piano and acts as music director for Universal recording artist Erin McCarley.  With McCarley he has performed on The Tonight Show with Jay Leno, the Late Show with David Letterman, and The Late Late Show with Craig Ferguson. Together they have performed with and/or opened for many artists including: Chris Isaak, David Gray, Ray Lamontagne, Guster, Brett Dennen, Jeff Beck, Paolo Nutini, and James Morrison.

Rhoads has toured and recorded with fellow Nashville musicians for a project called Ten Out of Tenn. He, along with the other artists in Ten Out Of Tenn, is the subject of a documentary entitled Any Day Now directed by Jeff Wyatt Wilson. The film was runner-up in the Nashville Film Festival. It is the story of 10 musical artists on tour together for one summer in 2008.

On January 22, 2014, Rhoads recorded a song in Nashville with Kris Allen they wrote for Allen's upcoming album with Charlie Peacock producing.

Rhoads' song  “Because You Are Who You Are" is featured in Academy Sports+ Outdoors' Fathers Day ad in 2015 as well as Apple's Mother's Day ad in 2016.

References

External links
 

Living people
1976 births
American male singer-songwriters
American singer-songwriters
American male composers
21st-century American composers
21st-century American singers
21st-century American male singers